Alexey Dmitriyevich Krutikov (1902–1962) was a Soviet politician and statesman who served as Deputy People's Commissar (1940–1946) / Deputy Minister (1946–1948) for Foreign Trade in 1940-1948 and Deputy Chairman of the Council of Ministers of the USSR in 1948-1949.

References

1902 births
1962 deaths
Communist Party of the Soviet Union members
Soviet politicians